Michihiro (written: 道弘, 道大, 道博, 通弘, 通洋, 通宏, 理大, 倫弘 or 導大) is a masculine Japanese given name. Notable people with the name include:

 (born 1943), Japanese voice actor
 (born 1972), Japanese singer and musician
 (born 1970), Japanese Go player
 (born 1973), Japanese baseball player
 (born 1975), Japanese mixed martial artist and judoka
 (born 1932), Japanese footballer
 (born 1957), Japanese musician
, Japanese ice hockey player
 (born 1988), Japanese sumo wrestler
 (born 1968), Japanese footballer
 (born 1987), Japanese footballer

Japanese masculine given names